SS Ithaka is a wrecked steam freighter and landmark on the coast of Hudson Bay near Churchill, Manitoba. Originally built as the lake freighter Frank A. Augsbury for the Canadian George Hall Coal & Shipping Corporation in 1922, she went on to sail for a variety of different owners in different locations being renamed to Granby in 1927, Parita II in 1948, Valbruna in 1951, Lawrencecliffe Hall in 1952, Federal Explorer in 1955 and finally Ithaka in 1960, before being wrecked later that year.

Career
She was built as the lake freighter Frank A. Augsbury for the George Hall Coal Company by Fraser, Brace, Ltd., of Trois-Rivières, Quebec and launched on 21 October 1922. She was sold to Canada Steamship Lines in 1927 and renamed Granby. She was taken over by the Ministry of War Transport and managed during the Second World War by France, Fenwick and Company.

Granby was taken to the Downs, and on 2 July 1945 was towed to Gravesend by the tugboats Empire Larch and Empire Mary. On 3 August she left Gravesend under tow and was laid up in the River Blackwater. She was sold to the Panamanian firm Cia Naviera Parita S.A. in 1948 and renamed Parita II, sailing for them until 1951, when she was acquired by the Italian shipping company Lloyd Mediterraneo S.p.A. di Nav., and renamed Valbruna. In 1952 she was bought by the successor company of her original owners, now trading as the Hall Corporation of Canada, Ltd., and returned to Canada under the name Lawrencecliffe Hall. She was sold again in 1955, this time to the Federal Commerce & Navigation Co., Ltd, who renamed her Federal Explorer.

Federal Commerce and Navigation used her as a supply ship to communities on the Canadian Arctic seaboard, twice chartering her to the Clarke Steamship Company in 1956, and using her to open the Federal Intercoastal Line in 1957. The Federal Explorer, under her master, Captain Simon Bouchard, delivered parts for new nickel mill under construction in Rankin Inlet in 1956 and also delivered cargoes of fuel oil to Royal Canadian Air Force stations in the Arctic. In 1958 she carried nickel concentrates to Churchill, Manitoba for shipment by rail to Fort Saskatchewan, and then delivered a cargo of grain from Churchill to Montreal in late October.

Final sale and wreck
Federal Explorer was sold for the final time, to the Ithaka Shipping Company in 1960, and was registered in Nassau, Bahamas by her owner, a Greek named J. Glikis. She was chartered to the Clarke Steamship Company to deliver nickel concentrate from the works at Rankin Inlet, and sailed from Churchill on 10 September 1960 to collect her cargo, carrying supplies for the settlement. She was caught in a severe gale while making the voyage, losing her rudder. She dropped anchor, but the anchors failed to hold, and she ran aground in Bird Cove, about ten miles east of Churchill, on 14 September.

The captain turned back to the safety of the port. But the weather was so bad that he decided to drop anchor. The anchor chain broke and her rudder was beaten off.

Her bottom was completely ripped out when the storm pounded her on the gravel bank. The insurers, Lloyd's of London, wrote off the vessel as a complete loss, but regarding the grounding as suspicious, refused to pay the insurance claim. All 37 crew members were rescued by the Canadian Coast Guard's CCGS William Alexander and were landed at Winnipeg, Manitoba on 18 September. The shallow water she grounded in meant that people could walk to the wreck at low tide, and her navigating instruments and much of her cargo, consisting of two generators and some plywood panels, as well as mission supplies, were salvaged.

References

1922 ships
Ships built in Quebec
Shipwrecks of the Canadian Arctic coast
Hudson Bay
Merchant ships of the Bahamas
Merchant ships of Canada
Merchant ships of Italy
Merchant ships of Panama
Merchant ships of the United Kingdom
Maritime incidents in 1960